Guppya is a genus of gastropods belonging to the family Euconulidae.

The species of this genus are found in America, Africa, Malesia.

Species:

Guppya angasi 
Guppya bauri 
Guppya biolleyi 
Guppya capsula 
Guppya coneyi
Guppya fulvoidea 
Guppya gundlachi 
Guppya hallucinata 
Guppya jalisco 
Guppya livida 
Guppya miamiensis 
Guppya micans 
Guppya micra 
Guppya molengraaffi 
Guppya montanicola 
Guppya perforata 
Guppya semisculpta 
Guppya sericea 
Guppya socorroana 
Guppya spirulata 
Guppya sterkii

References

Gastropods